The Lea Valley lines are two commuter lines and two branches in north-east London, so named because they run along the Lower Lea Valley of the River Lea. They were part of the Great Eastern Railway, now part of the Anglia Route of Network Rail.

On 31 May 2015, services between London Liverpool Street to Chingford, Cheshunt and Enfield Town were transferred to London Overground; services from London Liverpool Street and Stratford via Tottenham Hale to Hertford East and Bishops Stortford remain with Greater Anglia. Services operated by London Overground are now fully operated by new-built Class 710 rolling stock, replacing older Class 315 and Class 317 stock inherited from Greater Anglia.

History
The first section was opened by the Eastern Counties Railway (ECR) on 20 June 1839 from the London end at Devonshire Street to Romford, extended on 1 July 1840 to Bishopsgate (London end) and Brentwood. The Northern and Eastern Railway (N&ER) opened its first section from that line at Stratford to Broxbourne on 15 September 1840, and to Harlow in 1841; though it remained a separate entity, its line was leased to the ECR from 1 January 1844. A branch from Broxbourne to Hertford opened in 1843.

Enfield was reached on 1 March 1849 by the single-track Enfield Town branch from the N&ER at Angel Road via Lower Edmonton. The ECR was incorporated into the Great Eastern Railway (GER) in 1862. A shorter route to Edmonton was provided by the GER in 1872, from Bethnal Green via Hackney Downs and Stoke Newington, which opened on 27 May; the section via Seven Sisters and Lower Edmonton, at a new high-level station provided adjacent to the old low-level station, opened on 22 July. The line from there to Enfield was doubled at the same time. The old line between Angel Road and Lower Edmonton was closed to passenger trains in 1939, except for occasional diversionary traffic including the period in the 1950s when the rest of the local network was being electrified under the Eastern Region; the line closed completely in 1964 and the track was removed soon after.

Another branch, the Chingford branch line, went from Lea Bridge to Walthamstow, Shern Hall Street, in 1870, extended southwards to Hackney Downs in 1872 and northwards to Chingford in 1873.

The final section linked Lower Edmonton on the Enfield branch via Churchbury (later Southbury) with the Broxbourne line at Cheshunt, opening on 1 October 1891; it was known as the Churchbury loop until the renaming of that station in 1960, then the Southbury loop.

A station was proposed near Clapton called Queens Road but never opened.

Electrification of the lines via Seven Sisters to Hertford East, Enfield Town and Bishops Stortford, plus the Chingford branch, were completed in 1960. The line via Tottenham Hale was not electrified until 1969, using Class 125 diesel multiple units between 1958 and 1969.

Route and services
All express services start at either London Liverpool Street or Stratford and are operated by Abellio Greater Anglia as part of the Greater Anglia franchise. Suburban services operating on the Southbury Loop terminating at Cheshunt, on the Enfield Town branch and on Chingford branch are operated by London Overground. Services operating via the Southbury Loop that continue beyond Cheshunt, as well as on the line via Tottenham Hale, including services originating at Stratford, are operated by Greater Anglia.
The routes are:

 Southbury Loop (or Cheshunt Branch): London Liverpool Street – Cheshunt via Seven Sisters, Edmonton Green and Turkey Street, along the West Anglia Main Line to Hackney Downs Junction, rejoining it at Cheshunt Junction.
 Chingford Branch: London Liverpool Street – Chingford via Walthamstow Central, Wood Street and Highams Park, along the West Anglia Main Line to Clapton Junction.
 Enfield Town Branch: London Liverpool Street – Enfield Town via Seven Sisters, Edmonton Green and Bush Hill Park, along the West Anglia Main Line to Hackney Downs and the Southbury Loop to Edmonton Green and Edmonton Green Junction.
 Hertford East Branch: London Liverpool Street – Hertford East via Tottenham Hale, Broxbourne and Ware, along the West Anglia Main Line to Broxbourne and Rye House Junction, then the Hertford East branch line.
 Temple Mills Branch: Stratford – Tottenham Hale via Lea Bridge railway station, diverging from the Great Eastern Main Line and the North London Line at Temple Mills East Junction, joining the West Anglia Main Line at Coppermill Junction.

Until 1968 the Hall Farm Curve allowed trains from Stratford to Chingford. It may be reconstructed.

The lines were historically part of the Network Rail Strategic Route 5, SRS 05.02, 05.04 and part of 05.01. This was classified as a London and South East Commuter line.

A number of services to/from Liverpool Street/Enfield Town start or terminate in different places on special occasions. When Tottenham Hotspur F.C. are playing at home, additional trains run, some starting/terminating from White Hart Lane or Seven Sisters.

The lines are double track for most of its length, however between Hackney Downs and Liverpool Street it is multitrack – the suburban lines for trains stopping at Bethnal Green, Cambridge Heath and London Fields and the Main Lines for non-stop West Anglia/Stansted Express services. It is electrified at 25 kV AC using overhead line equipment and has a line speed of 40–75 mph except between Cheshunt and Coppermill junction where it is 60–85 mph. Different sections have different loading gauges. Most is W8, with the branches to Enfield Town and Chingford being W6 and the branch to Stratford W9.

Future developments
The Tottenham Hale–West Anglian route is planned to become part of Crossrail 2 to Cheshunt, Broxbourne and Hertford East.

References 

Railway lines in London
Railway lines in the East of England
Lee Valley Park
Standard gauge railways in England
Transport in the City of London
Transport in the London Borough of Enfield
Transport in the London Borough of Hackney
Transport in the London Borough of Haringey
Transport in the London Borough of Tower Hamlets
Transport in the London Borough of Waltham Forest